Shi Yousan (1891 – December 1940) was a KMT general who defected to, and subsequently betrayed, Feng Yuxiang, Chiang Kai-shek, Wang Jingwei, Zhang Xueliang, the Chinese Communist Party, and Japan, in that order.

In 1928, his troops set fire to the Shaolin Monastery, burning it for over 40 days, destroying 90 percent of the buildings including many manuscripts of the temple library.

While leading the 39th Army Group, he planned to defect to the Japanese, but before he could do so he was kidnapped and killed by his sworn brother and subordinate Gao Shuxun, who later gained command of this unit.

For his many betrayals and defections he is known as the "Defector General" or as Shi Sanfan ("Stone who turns three times").

See also
 Lü Bu

References

National Revolutionary Army generals from Jilin
People of the Northern Expedition
People of the Central Plains War
Military personnel of the Republic of China in the Second Sino-Japanese War
1891 births
1940 deaths
Assassinated Chinese people
People executed by smothering
Deaths by live burial
People from Changchun
Traitors in history